The Donna Reed Show is an American sitcom starring Donna Reed as the middle-class housewife Donna Stone. Carl Betz co-stars as her pediatrician husband Dr. Alex Stone, and Shelley Fabares and Paul Petersen as their teenage children, Mary and Jeff. The show originally aired on ABC from September 24, 1958, to September 3, 1966.

Series overview

Episodes

Season 1 (1958–59)

Season 2 (1959–60)

Season 3 (1960–61)

Season 4 (1961–62)

Season 5 (1962–63)

Season 6 (1963–64)

Season 7 (1964–65)

Season 8 (1965–66)

References

External links

1958 American television series debuts
1966 American television series endings
1950s American sitcoms
1960s American sitcoms
American Broadcasting Company original programming
Black-and-white American television shows
English-language television shows
Television series about families
Television series by Screen Gems